Villány (or) is a town in Baranya County, Hungary that is famous for its wine. Residents are Hungarians, with minority of Croats, Serbs and Germans of Hungary. Until the end of World War II, the inhabitants were Danube Swabians, also called locally as Stifolder, because their ancestors once came around 1720 from Fulda (district). Mostly of the former German Settlers was expelled to Allied-occupied Germany and Allied-occupied Austria in 1945–1948, about the Potsdam Agreement. Only a few Germans of Hungary live there, the majority today are descendant of Hungarians from the Czechoslovak–Hungarian population exchange. They received the houses of the former Danube Swabians inhabitants.

Etymology
The name derives from the Hungarian word for lightning, villám. Formerly (centuries ago), the settlement was recorded under this form of name.

History 

After the Ottoman occupation until 1918, VILLÁNY was part of the Austrian monarchy, province of Hungary; in Transleithania after the compromise of 1867 in the Kingdom of Hungary. A post-office was opened end of 1867 (depending on from Oedenburg Post Directorate).

Geography

The city is located in the encounter of three large geographical regions: the Great Hungarian Plain from the south, Baranya Hills from the north, and finally Villány Mountains border it from the west. On the plain, agricultural activity is common. The mountains and the hills provide a suitable place for wine producing.

A fossil site known as "Villány locality 6" or "Villány-Kalkberg Süd" has yielded many vertebrate fossils from Lower Pleistocene.

Demographics

The settlement's population, divided to age groups:

Twin towns – sister cities

Villány is twinned with:
 Eislingen, Germany
 Stainz, Austria
 Vețca, Romania
 Zamárdi, Hungary

Wine region
Villány is the most famous red wine region in Hungary. The southernmost wine region has the highest number of sunshine hours. Hungary's climate is continental. However, the Villány wine region is characterized by its sub-Mediterranean climate because of its location. Here's a great, full-bodied Bordeaux-style red wine cuvee. French varieties Cabernet Sauvignon, Cabernet Franc, Merlot had a great time here. There is also Portugieser, Kékfrankos, but we can also meet Kadarka and Syrah grapes. Of course, white grapes are also cultivated by winemakers such as Italian Riesling, Chardonnay, Sauvignon Blanc and Green Veltelini.

Híres borászatok:

 Gere Attila Pincészete www.gere.hu
 Bock Pince www.bock.hu
 Tiffán Pince www.tiffans.hu
 Polgár Pincészet www.polgarpince.hu
 Sauska Pincészet www.sauska.hu
 Gere Tamás és Zsolt Pincészete www.geretamas.hu
 Malatinszky Kúria www.malatinszky.hu 
 Günczer Tamás Pincészet www.borbinceszet.hu
 Maul Borászat www.maul.hu 
 Szende Pince www.szendepince.hu
 Cult of Wine Villány, a Művészpince www.cultofwine.hu
 Vitényi Pince www.vitenyi-pince.hu
 Blum Pince www.blumpince.hu
 Gal Pince www.galpince.hu
 Agancsos Pincészet www.agancsos.hu
 Kecskés Pincészet 
 Dolium Pince

References

External links

  in Hungarian

Populated places in Baranya County
Wine regions of Hungary
Baranya (region)
History of Baranya (region)
Hungarian German communities
Serb communities in Hungary